The Price of Life is a 1987 38-minute long American drama and science fiction film made by Chanticleer Films, directed by Stephen Tolkin and produced by Jana Sue Memel (story by Stephen Tolkin and Michel Monteaux). The film has music composed by Ken Fix. The film stars Dana Andersen, Diana Bellamy, Roy Brocksmith and Ron Campbell in the lead roles.

Premise and plot
The basic premise of the film is that a time account is physically linked to every infant at birth, with death automatic when the balance drops to zero. An elite upper-class is portrayed as living hundreds of years or more. The protagonist is given a certain amount of time as an infant, and as a young boy adds days and years to his time account by buying valuables from people and selling them to visiting tourists from the rich enclave. After his sister dies after gambling away her time, the protagonist (now a young man) sets out on a journey to the enclave of "the Old Ones" in order to save the life of his mother, who is (literally) running out of time. He gets there and meets a beautiful older woman who co-opts him into the immortal lifestyle.

Later, similar work
The basic concept and basic plot elements of The Price of Life are practically identical to the later-made 2011 film In Time, which does not acknowledge being a remake of The Price of Life.

Cast
 Dana Andersen as Alice
 Diana Bellamy as Mother
 Roy Brocksmith as The Old One
 Ron Campbell as Stiles
 Dustin Diamond as Young Stiles
 Elizabeth Farley as Customer
 John Fleck as Walter
 Ray Galvin as Old Man
 Willie Garson as Father

References

External links
 

1987 films
1987 short films
1980s science fiction drama films
American science fiction drama films
Films with screenplays by Stephen Tolkin
1987 drama films
1980s English-language films
1980s American films